State Highway 188 (SH 188) is a state highway in the Coastal Bend region of Texas. It runs  from Mathis east to Aransas Bay between Rockport and Port Aransas. SH 188 was established in its current form in 1992, after a previous incarnation existed from 1932 to 1942.

History

Previous route
SH 188 was previously designated on November 30, 1932, as a connector route between then-SH 5 and Roxton. This route was canceled on April 29, 1942, and was replaced by FM 38.

Current route
SH 188 was designated on December 22, 1992, replacing part of FM 881 and part of FM 1069, of which SH 188 was concurrent with. On June 29, 1993, SH 188 was extended  over another part of FM 1069, canceling the section of FM 1069 east of the junction with SH 188, transferring it to SH 188, and the remainder of FM 881 was redesignated as part of FM 1069.

Major intersections

See also

 List of state highways in Texas

References

External links

188
Transportation in San Patricio County, Texas
Transportation in Aransas County, Texas